Levi Lemar Samuels Colwill (born 26 February 2003) is an English professional footballer who plays as a centre-back for Brighton & Hove Albion, on loan from Chelsea.

Club career

Chelsea
Born in Southampton, Colwill joined Chelsea at under-9 level, having previously played for City Central.

2021–22 season: Loan to Huddersfield Town
In June 2021, he joined Championship club Huddersfield Town on loan. He made his professional debut in a 4–2 penalty shootout win against Sheffield Wednesday in the EFL Cup on 1 August 2021. He scored his first goal for Huddersfield, a late winner, in a 2–1 win at Sheffield United on 21 August 2021. Throughout the season he suffered from ankle, knee and hip problems, as well as COVID-19. On 29 May 2022, Colwill scored an own-goal as Huddersfield lost 1–0 to Nottingham Forest in the 2021–22 Championship play-off final.

2022–23 season: Loan to Brighton & Hove Albion
On 5 August 2022, Colwill joined fellow Premier League side Brighton & Hove Albion on loan for the duration of the 2022–23 season. He made his Seagulls and Premier League debut two days later against Manchester United, coming on as a 90+1st minute substitute for Solly March in Brighton's first ever win at Old Trafford after winning 2–1. Colwill made his first Premier League start on 13 November, coming close to scoring an equaliser in the 2–1 home defeat against Aston Villa.

International career
Colwill has represented England at under-16 and under-17 levels. With the under-17 team he won the Syrenka Cup in 2019.

On 27 August 2021, Colwill received his first call up for the England U21s.

On 10 November 2021, Colwill made his debut for – and captained – the England U19s in a 4–0 victory over Andorra in a 2022 UEFA European Under-19 Championship qualification match. He scored his first goal for the U19s six days later during a 2–0 win against Sweden.

On 25 March 2022, Colwill made his England U21 debut during a 4–1 win over Andorra at Bournemouth.

Playing style
Colwill has been compared to John Terry due to his shirt number, status as an academy graduate of Chelsea, and position.

Personal life
Barry and Byron Mason, Colwill's uncles, won the 2014 FA Vase Final with Sholing, with Colwill walking out at Wembley Stadium as a mascot. Another uncle of Colwill's also played for Sholing.

Career statistics

References

2003 births
Living people
Footballers from Southampton
English footballers
England youth international footballers
Chelsea F.C. players
Huddersfield Town A.F.C. players
Brighton & Hove Albion F.C. players
Association football defenders
English Football League players
England under-21 international footballers
Premier League players